Diphyes is a genus of hydrozoans belonging to the family Diphyidae.

The genus has cosmopolitan distribution.

Species:

Diphyes antarctica 
Diphyes bojani 
Diphyes chamissonis 
Diphyes dispar 
Diphyes truncata

References

Diphyidae
Hydrozoan genera